Toyloq is an urban-type settlement in Samarqand Region, Uzbekistan. It is the capital of Toyloq District. The town population was 6,548 people in 1989, and 13,700 in 2016.

References

Populated places in Samarqand Region
Urban-type settlements in Uzbekistan